Ronald Johnson (November 25, 1935 – March 4, 1998) was an American poet. Born in Ashland, Kansas, he graduated from Columbia University, lived in New York in the late 1950s, wandered around Appalachia and Britain for a number of years, then settled in San Francisco for the next twenty-five years before returning to Kansas, where he died.

Biography

Early life and education

Johnson was born in Ashland, Kansas on November 25, 1935, and attended University of Kansas and Columbia University, where he got his B.A.  He then hiked the Appalachian Trail and Europe and there was inspired by what he saw to become a poet.

San Francisco

Ron Johnson moved from Kansas to San Francisco, spending 25 years of his life there.  He was active in the San Francisco gay community in Bear culture and was a co-founder of the Rainbow Motorcycle Club.

Literary career
At the beginning of his career Johnson was allied with the Black Mountain School's second generation, but then began to experiment with the poetics of the concrete poetry movement.

Johnson's book-length poem RADI OS (Sand Dollar Press, 1977) is an early and influential example of erasure poetry. He wrote it by blacking out words in a copy of John Milton's Paradise Lost. Johnson rewrote the first four books of Milton's poem in this way, producing a new text in which the few remaining words float in the white page space left by the absent words.  Although Johnson apparently considered RADI OS to be a section of his long poem ARK, it was not included in any edition of that poem. Flood Editions reprinted it in 2005.

Johnson's major book is the long poem ARK, begun in 1970 and taking him twenty years to write. The poem follows in the tradition of the "American epic", a  heritage once described as "that strange, amorphous, anomalous, self-contradictory thing". This mythology of an ambitious and protean epic project--- grand in creation and design--- beginning (arguably) with Walt Whitman's Leaves of Grass was continued into the 20th century by Ezra Pound's The Cantos, Louis Zukofsky's "A", William Carlos Williams' Paterson, Charles Olson's The Maximus Poems, Robert Duncan's Passages, Gertrude Stein's Stanzas in Meditation, and H.D.'s Helen in Egypt. Like these works, Johnson wrote ARK over long stretches of time. It became a lifetime "preoccupation" and "the poem of a life".

Johnson was also a well-regarded author of cookbooks, including "The Aficionado's Southwestern Cooking" (1985) and "The American Table" (1984).

Johnson's last book, The Shrubberies, was published in 2001 and, according to the critic Stephen Burt,  "showed a poet no less spiritual than the author of ARK but also one given to extreme concision." Soon after ARK returned to print in a new edition, Burt contributed an extended appreciation of Johnson's magnum opus to the pages of The New Yorker.

Ronald Johnson, described by Guy Davenport as America's greatest living poet, died at his father's home in Topeka, Kansas on March 4, 1998.

Selected bibliography
A Line of Poetry, A Row of Trees (Highlands, NC: Jargon Press, 1964)
Valley of the Many-Colored Grasses. (New York: W. W. Norton, 1969)
RADI OS I-IV. (Berkeley: Sand Dollar Press, 1977)
To Do As Adam Did: Selected Poems of Ronald Johnson, edited with an introduction by Peter O'Leary. (Talisman House, Jersey City, 2000)
ARK, (Flood Editions, 2013)
The Book of the Green Man, with an afterword by Ross Hair. (Axminster: Uniformbooks, 2015)

Legacy
Johnson was honored in 2017 along with other notables, named on bronze bootprints, as part of San Francisco South of Market Leather History Alley.

References

External links
The Book of the Green Man Johnson's first published book of poems, available here on-line from "Light & Dust"
the arches: A Ronald Johnson site Site devoted to Johnson, with biography, bibliography, interview, and select poems
Height of Spring 1999   An essay Jonathan Williams (a poet and publisher central to 20th century poetry in America) wrote on Johnson in 1999.  Williams was a mentor to, lover and publisher of, the poet. Johnson's work The Book of the Green Man came out of their walking tour of England.
Ronald Johnson Papers (MS 66), (MS D214), and (MS 336) and housed at the Kenneth Spencer Research Library, University of Kansas
Ronald Johnson Page at Poetry Foundation

1935 births
1998 deaths
People from Clark County, Kansas
American LGBT poets
20th-century American poets
20th-century American LGBT people